The FIL European Luge Championships 2000 took place in Winterberg, Germany for the third time having hosted the event previously in 1982 and 1992. The team event format was reduced to one run each in men's doubles, men's singles, and women's singles for the total time.

Medalists

Medal table

References

FIL European Luge Championships
2000 in luge
Luge in Germany
2000 in German sport
International sports competitions hosted by Germany
January 2000 sports events in Europe